Colin Rutterford (born 1 August 1943) is a former English cricketer.  Rutterford was a left-handed batsman who bowled right-arm fast-medium.  He was born in Lakenheath, Suffolk.

Rutterford made his debut for Suffolk in the 1965 Minor Counties Championship against Buckinghamshire.  Rutterford played Minor counties cricket for Suffolk from 1965 to 1986, making 119 Minor Counties Championship appearances and 4 MCCA Knockout Trophy appearances.  Rutterford took 431 wickets in the Minor Counties Championship for Suffolk, second only to Cyril Perkins, who took 779.  He made his List A debut against Kent in the 1966 Gillette Cup.  He made seven further List A matches for Suffolk, the last of which came against Worcestershire in the 1984 NatWest Trophy.  In his eight List A matches for Suffolk, he scored 57 runs at an average of 28.50, with a high score of 22 not out.  With the ball, he took 7 wickets at a bowling average of 29.28, with best figures of 3/14.

Playing for Suffolk allowed Rutterford to represent Minor Counties East in the 1978 Benson & Hedges Cup, with him making three appearances against Middlesex, Sussex and Northamptonshire.  In these matches, he took 4 wickets at an average of 30.25, with best figures of 2/16.

References

External links
Colin Rutterford at ESPNcricinfo
Colin Rutterford at CricketArchive

1943 births
Living people
People from Lakenheath
English cricketers
Suffolk cricketers
Minor Counties cricketers
Suffolk cricket captains